Harmol is a chemical compound classified as a β-carboline.  It is readily formed in vivo in humans by O-demethylation of harmine.

See also 
 Harmalol

References

Beta-Carbolines
Human metabolites
Phenols